The following is a list of translations of Rainer Marie Rilke's Duino Elegies. They are grouped by language and listed alphabetically by the last name of the translator.

English

Catalan

Chinese

Czech

Dutch

French

Hungarian

Italian

Japanese

Spanish

Swedish
 

Poetry by Rainer Maria Rilke
Translation-related lists